Phetpangan Mor.Ratanabandit is a Thai Muay Thai fighter.

Titles and accomplishments
Rajadamnern Stadium
 2019 Rajadamnern Stadium Featherweight (126 lbs) Champion

World Muaythai Council
 2022 WMC World Super Featherweight (130 lbs) Champion

Fight record

|-  style="background:#CCFFCC;"
| 2022-08-24|| Win||align=left| Chatmungkorn Chor.Hapayak || Muay Thai Palangmai, Rajadamnern Stadium ||Bangkok, Thailand || Decision || 5 || 3:00

|-  style="background:#CCFFCC;"
| 2022-06-11|| Win||align=left| Alex Avogadro || Golden Fight Night ||Valenza, Italy || Decision  || 5 || 3:00
|-
! style=background:white colspan=9 |

|-  style="background:#fbb;"
| 2022-04-16|| Loss ||align=left| Petchsukhumvit Boybangna || Sor.Sommai + Pitaktham|| Phayao province, Thailand || KO (Knee to the body) || 3 || 
|-  style="background:#cfc;"
| 2022-03-11|| Win||align=left| Saksri Kiatmoo9 ||Muaymanwansuk, Rangsit Stadium || Rangsit, Thailand || KO (Low kick)  ||2 ||
|-  style="background:#cfc;"
| 2022-01-01|| Win ||align=left| Yodtongthai Sor.Sommai ||Suekjao Muaythai, Omnoi Stadium || Bangkok, Thailand || Decision || 5||3:00
|-  style="background:#fbb;"
| 2021-10-30|| Loss ||align=left| Buakiew Por.Paoin||Suekjao Muaythai || Bangkok, Thailand || Decision || 5||3:00  
|-  style="background:#fbb;"
| 2021-09-15|| Loss ||align=left| Ploywittaya NayokwitThungSong ||Chefboontham, Lumpinee Studio || Bangkok, Thailand || Decision || 5 || 3:00 
|-  style="background:#c5d2ea;"
| 2020-12-07|| NC ||align=left| Wanchana Nor.Narissorn || Road to ONE 5: WSS ||Bangkok, Thailand || No contest (low blow) || 3 ||
|-  style="background:#CCFFCC;"
| 2020-11-12|| Win||align=left| Wanchana Nor.Narissorn || Rajadamnern Stadium ||Bangkok, Thailand || Decision || 5 || 3:00
|-  style="background:#FFBBBB;"
| 2020-07-23|| Loss||align=left| Berkban JoeNuvo || Rajadamnern Stadium ||Bangkok, Thailand || Decision || 5 || 3:00
|-  style="background:#CCFFCC;"
| 2020-03-12|| Win||align=left| Yodkitsada Yuthachonburi || Rajadamnern Stadium ||Bangkok, Thailand || Decision || 5 || 3:00
|-  style="background:#FFBBBB;"
| 2020-02-06|| Loss||align=left| Prajanban SorJor.Vichitpadriew || Rajadamnern Stadium ||Bangkok, Thailand || Decision || 5 || 3:00
|-  style="background:#CCFFCC;"
| 2019-12-26|| Win||align=left| Kongthoranee Sor.Sommai || Rajadamnern Stadium ||Bangkok, Thailand || Decision || 5 || 3:00
|-  style="background:#CCFFCC;"
| 2019-10-21|| Win||align=left| Thanupetch Wor.Sangprapai || Rajadamnern Stadium ||Bangkok, Thailand || Decision || 5 || 3:00
|-  style="background:#CCFFCC;"
| 2019-09-02|| Win||align=left| Kongthoranee Sor.Sommai || Rajadamnern Stadium ||Bangkok, Thailand || Decision || 5 || 3:00
|-  style="background:#CCFFCC;"
| 2019-08-01|| Win||align=left| Yodkitsada Yuthachonburi || Rajadamnern Stadium ||Bangkok, Thailand || Decision || 5 || 3:00
|-
! style=background:white colspan=9 |
|-  style="background:#FFBBBB;"
| 2019-06-30|| Loss||align=left| Masashi Kumura || K-1 World GP 2019: Super Bantamweight World Tournament, Quarter Finals || Saitama, Japan || TKO (2 Knockowns/punches) || 1 || 2:28
|-  style="background:#FFBBBB;"
| 2019-04-25|| Loss||align=left| Kongthoranee Sor.Sommai || Rajadamnern Stadium ||Bangkok, Thailand || Decision || 5 || 3:00
|-  style="background:#CCFFCC;"
| 2019-02-22|| Win ||align=left| Berkban Aunsukhumvit || Rajadamnern Stadium ||Bangkok, Thailand || Decision || 5 || 3:00
|-  style="background:#FFBBBB;"
| 2019-01-28|| Loss||align=left| Surachai Sor.Sommai || Rajadamnern Stadium ||Bangkok, Thailand || Decision || 5 || 3:00
|-  style="background:#c5d2ea;"
| 2019-01-03|| Draw||align=left| Surachai Sor.Sommai || Rajadamnern Stadium ||Bangkok, Thailand || Decision || 5 || 3:00
|-  style="background:#CCFFCC;"
| 2018-11-28|| Win ||align=left| Petchthaksin Sor.Sommai || Rajadamnern Stadium ||Bangkok, Thailand || Decision || 5 || 3:00
|-  style="background:#CCFFCC;"
| 2018-10-15|| Win ||align=left| Jompikat Chuwattana || Rajadamnern Stadium ||Bangkok, Thailand || Decision || 5 || 3:00
|-  style="background:#CCFFCC;"
| 2018-08-29|| Win ||align=left| Flukenoi Muayded789 || Rajadamnern Stadium ||Bangkok, Thailand || Decision || 5 || 3:00
|-  style="background:#FFBBBB;"
| 2018-07-16|| Loss ||align=left| Yodkitsada Yuthachonburi || Rajadamnern Stadium ||Bangkok, Thailand || Decision || 5 || 3:00
|-  style="background:#CCFFCC;"
| 2018-06-21|| Win ||align=left| Gingsanglek Tor.Laksong || Rajadamnern Stadium ||Bangkok, Thailand || Decision || 5 || 3:00
|-  style="background:#CCFFCC;"
| 2018-05-23|| Win ||align=left| Yodbuadaeng Theglaffpattaya || Rajadamnern Stadium ||Bangkok, Thailand || Decision || 5 || 3:00
|-  style="background:#fbb;"
| 2018-04-01|| Loss ||align=left| Prakayphet Nitisamui || Blue Arena || Samut Prakan, Thailand || Decision || 5 || 3:00
|-
! style=background:white colspan=9 |
|-  style="background:#CCFFCC;"
| 2018-02-14|| Win ||align=left| Roichueng Singmawin || Rajadamnern Stadium ||Bangkok, Thailand || Decision || 5 || 3:00
|-  style="background:#CCFFCC;"
| 2018-01-12|| Win ||align=left| Oley Tor.Laksong || Lumpinee Stadium ||Bangkok, Thailand || Decision || 5 || 3:00
|-  style="background:#CCFFCC;"
| 2017-12-14|| Win ||align=left| Sanpetch Sitnayokgaipaedriw || Rajadamnern Stadium ||Bangkok, Thailand || Decision || 5 || 3:00
|-  style="background:#CCFFCC;"
| 2017-09-21|| Win ||align=left| Pichitman Sitnansrinon || Rajadamnern Stadium ||Bangkok, Thailand || KO || 4 ||
|-  style="background:#FFBBBB;"
| 2017-08-16|| Loss ||align=left| Roichueng Singmawin || Rajadamnern Stadium ||Bangkok, Thailand || Decision || 5 || 3:00
|-  style="background:#FFBBBB;"
| 2017-06-15|| Loss ||align=left| Sanpetch Sitnayokgaipaedriw|| Rajadamnern Stadium ||Bangkok, Thailand || Decision || 5 || 3:00
|-  style="background:#FFBBBB;"
| 2017-05-01|| Loss ||align=left| Fameeta Taembangsai || Rajadamnern Stadium ||Bangkok, Thailand || Decision || 5 || 3:00
|-  style="background:#FFBBBB;"
| 2017-01-19|| Loss ||align=left| Prajanban Sor.Jor.Wichitbaetriw || Rajadamnern Stadium ||Bangkok, Thailand || Decision || 5 || 3:00
|-  style="background:#CCFFCC;"
| 2016-12-15|| Win ||align=left| Petchgiangkrai R-Airline || Rajadamnern Stadium ||Bangkok, Thailand || Decision || 5 || 3:00
|-  style="background:#FFBBBB;"
| 2016-09-17|| Loss ||align=left| Phetniyom F.A.Group || Montri Studio ||Bangkok, Thailand || Decision || 5 || 3:00
|-  style="background:#FFBBBB;"
| 2016-07-21|| Loss ||align=left| Kongkrabi STD Transport || Rajadamnern Stadium ||Bangkok, Thailand || Decision || 5 || 3:00
|-  style="background:#CCFFCC;"
| 2016-06-22|| Win||align=left| Phetsuphan Por.Daorungruang || Rajadamnern Stadium ||Bangkok, Thailand || Decision || 5 || 3:00
|-  style="background:#CCFFCC;"
| 2016-05-26|| Win||align=left|  Phetsakon Tor.Laksong || Rajadamnern Stadium ||Bangkok, Thailand || KO || 4 ||
|-  style="background:#FFBBBB;"
| 2016-05-04|| Loss||align=left|  Seryai Chor.Hapayak || Rajadamnern Stadium ||Bangkok, Thailand || Decision || 5 || 3:00
|-  style="background:#FFBBBB;"
| 2016-04-09|| Loss||align=left|  Sayanlek Sayangym || Rajadamnern Stadium ||Bangkok, Thailand || Decision || 5 || 3:00
|-  style="background:#CCFFCC;"
| 2016-02-13|| Win||align=left| Fahlan Por.Phetkhaikaew || Montri Studio ||Bangkok, Thailand || Decision || 5 || 3:00
|-  style="background:#FFBBBB;"
| 2016-01-09|| Loss ||align=left| Cherry Duangjaiphor || Montri Studio ||Bangkok, Thailand || KO|| 3 ||
|-  style="background:#CCFFCC;"
| 2015-12-01|| Win ||align=left| Yodsiam FighterMuaythai  || Lumpinee Stadium ||Bangkok, Thailand || Decision || 5 || 3:00
|-  style="background:#CCFFCC;"
| 2015-11-06|| Win ||align=left| Phayakmongkol Teeded99  || Lumpinee Stadium ||Bangkok, Thailand || KO || 3 ||
|-  style="background:#FFBBBB;"
| 2015-10-15|| Loss ||align=left| Diesellek PetchyindeeAcademy  || Rajadamnern Stadium ||Bangkok, Thailand || Decision || 5 || 3:00
|-  style="background:#FFBBBB;"
| 2015-07-10|| Loss||align=left| Kiewpayak Jitmuangnon || Lumpinee Stadium ||Bangkok, Thailand || Decision || 5 || 3:00
|-  style="background:#CCFFCC;"
| 2015-05-13|| Win||align=left| Chaiyo PetchyindeeAcademy || Rajadamnern Stadium ||Bangkok, Thailand || Decision || 5 || 3:00
|-  style="background:#CCFFCC;"
| 2015-03-29|| Win||align=left| Sakchainoi Sit Sor Tor Lek  || Rangsit Stadium ||Thailand || Decision || 5 || 3:00
|-  style="background:#CCFFCC;"
| 2015-02-06|| Win||align=left| Neuamek Sitjaymeaw  || Lumpinee Stadium ||Bangkok, Thailand || Decision || 5 || 3:00
|-  style="background:#CCFFCC;"
| 2015-01-11|| Win||align=left| Numtrangnoi Singpomprab  || Rangsit Stadium ||Thailand || Decision || 5 || 3:00
|-
| colspan=9 | Legend:

References

Phetpangan Mor.Ratanabandit
Living people
1998 births
Phetpangan Mor.Ratanabandit